State Route 536 (SR 536) is a state highway in Monroe County, Ohio. The route south of the northernmost intersection with SR 7 in Hannibal is not signed by the Ohio Department of Transportation (ODOT). The route is signed and designated as a north–south route though the route physically runs northwest–southeast.

Route description
SR 536 begins unsigned at the West Virginia state line on the New Martinsville Bridge while crossing over the Ohio River. The bridge carries West Virginia Route 7 east of this point. The route heads due west over the remainder of the bridge until both directions of the two-lane road split apart and immediately intersect SR 7, a divided highway. Officially, the two routes run concurrent north for  until the intersection with Main Street though according to signage, SR 536 begins at this intersection with Main Street.

Here, the route becomes fully signed and travels west through Hannibal. Near the center of town, the route turns north, passes a school, and begins climbing a hill. After many hairpin turns, the road is out of Hannibal and travels at the top of a ridge through the Monroe County hills. Except when it descends into the Opossum Creek valley, it remains at the top of the hills as it travels northwest through Ohio and Green Townships as well as portions of the Wayne National Forest. The route ends at an unsignalized intersection in Adams Township with SR 78.

History
The highway connecting Hannibal and SR 78 was first designated as SR 536 in 1937. The route remained largely unchanged except in 1961 when the New Martinsville Bridge opened.

Major intersections

References

536
Transportation in Monroe County, Ohio